Lonely Runs Both Ways is the twelfth album by bluegrass music group Alison Krauss & Union Station, released November 23, 2004. The album won the band three Grammy Awards in 2006, including Best Country Performance By a Duo or Group with Vocal for the song "Restless", Best Country Instrumental Performance for "Unionhouse Branch", and Best Country Album. The song "A Living Prayer" was honored with the award for Bluegrass Recorded Song of the Year from the Gospel Music Association.

Track listing

Personnel
 Alison Krauss – lead vocals, fiddle, viola
 Dan Tyminski – lead vocals, background vocals, acoustic guitar, mandolin
 Ron Block – background vocals, acoustic guitar, banjo, slide guitar 
 Jerry Douglas – dobro, lap steel guitar
 Barry Bales – background vocals, upright bass

Charts

Weekly charts

Year-end charts

References

2004 albums
Alison Krauss & Union Station albums
Rounder Records albums
Grammy Award for Best Country Album